Hishikawa Moronobu (1618 – 25 July 1694) was a Japanese artist known for popularizing the ukiyo-e genre of woodblock prints and paintings in the late 17th century. He consolidated the works of scattered Japanese art styles and forged the early development of ukiyo-e.

Early life
Born in Hoda at the distant end of Edo Bay, Moronobu was the son of a well-respected embroiderer of rich tapestries who produced it for the use of temples and wealthy patrons. After moving to Edo in the 1660s, Moronobu, who had likely learned skills from his father's craft, and studied both Tosa and Kanō-style painting. He thus had a solid grounding in both decorative crafts and academic painting, which served him well when he then turned to ukiyo-e, which he studied with his mentor, the Kanbun Master.

Work
The earliest known illustration of Moronobu that can be dated comes from his work titled One Hundred Warrior Poets from 1672, although earlier works are yet possible to surface. By the mid-1670s Moronobu had already become the most important ukiyo-e printmaker, a position he maintained until his death. He produced more than 100 sets of illustrations, perhaps as many as 150, with around 20 being of an erotic nature. Though it is difficult to attribute to him many unsigned examples (for example, the scholar Kiyoshi Shibui established, in 1926, a basis for crediting some of the designs previously given to Moronobu as the work of Sugumura Jihei). Very few of Moronobu's single-sheet prints have survived, and most, if not all, are unsigned.

Moronobu was not the "founder" of ukiyo-e, as some early scholars surmised. Instead, he made an assimilation of inchoate ukiyo-e designs by previous artists, a consolidation of genre and early ukiyo-e painting and prints. It was Moronobu who created the first truly mature form of ukiyo-e, in a style of great strength and presence that would set the standards for generations of artists who followed. Moronobu's mastery of line has often been cited in assessments of his oeuvre, as well as the interactive arrangement of figures, which seem always to serve a dramatic function not usually seen in the work of his predecessors.

Some of Moronobu's prints are found with hand coloring, but this specimen is a sumizuri-e  (:ja:墨摺絵) (print with black pigment only) in its original, uncolored state. There is something almost elemental in Moronobu's line work and figure placements in black and white, which most often was diminished into more decorative effects when colors were applied by hand. The black and gray lines and solid areas contrast boldly with the white paper to produce a range of tonal values, with emphasis on the shape and movement of the lines and the "positive" values of the white spaces. As in many other designs by Moronobu, the artist was inventive in his use of curvilinear forms juxtaposed against straight diagonals.

Groupings of 12 images had been common for centuries in court and genre paintings. Among the more famous surviving early specimens were the painted single sheets by the master Tosa Mitsunobu (1434–1525). Thus Moronobu's adoption of a grouping of 12 was conventional enough, particularly as such an arrangement afforded a context in which to alter the furnishings, clothing, and design patterns, matched more or less to the months of the year. However, it cannot be said that much shunga (erotic art) strictly adhered to seasonal progressions or 12-step narratives. Moronobu's print qualifies as an abuna-e (危な絵;"risqué print"), a non-explicit erotic design of a type often found as the frontispiece to shunga sets or occasionally interspersed among the explicit sheets. Moronobu's formalism is evident here, with curves and straight lines balanced in near perfect proportion. As for the amorous couple, the seduction has just begun with the loosening of the obi (the woman's sash). Erotic signifiers enhance the scene. For example, the young beauty raises her right sleeve toward her mouth in a gesture of suppressed emotion. Water imagery evokes the woman's sexuality, with feminine or "yin" erotic symbols in the garden stream behind the lovers and in the waves on the robe of the young gallant, while the flowering ume on the standing screen serves as a metaphor for male or "yang" sexuality.

In 1685, the ukiyo-e book  by Moronobu was published. It features heroic popular tales of samurai warriors with simple descriptions per artwork. The title includes the word bushido and it was meant for children which shows that it had spread among the general population.

Despite his popularity with ukiyo-e prints, his illustrations found in collaborations with other artists and in printed books are kicked off his career. In some cases Moronobu would take the images and subjects from other prints and illustrations made in Kyoto but would replace the images with his own illustrations to make it his own. A common subject Moronobu worked with was the depiction of  women in their daily lives. He did this right up until the end of the 19th century, or in other words, the end of the Edo period. An example would be his contribution of illustrations for Hyankunin isshu zōsanshō (One Hundred Poets with Portraits and Commentaries). This publication produced an argument on whether it was designed for women or not. Moronobu's illustrations can also be found in The Pictorial Survey, drafted by Ochikochi Dōin. The images depicted include long military processions and travelers of all ages and stations. As he continued to do prints the subjects, scenes, colors, composition, and even his line work changed with adaptation of techniques and the audience that was interested in the current activities displayed.

As a famous ukiyo-e he drew, there is a beautiful figure in return.  This painting was completed around the 17th century, depicting a beautiful woman wearing a kimono turning around. It was adopted as a stamp design around 1948 and became popular.

Moronobu's work is held in numerous museum collections around the world, and in the Library of Congress.

Gallery

References

External links

 Ukiyoe The third story
Beauty looking back, Tokyo National Museum
Kabuki drama, Tokyo National Museum
More examples of Moronobu's work can be found at Ukiyo-e Search

Ukiyo-e artists
1618 births
1694 deaths
Japanese erotic artists
Artists from Chiba Prefecture
17th-century Japanese artists